The Big Trail (French: La Piste des géants) is a 1931 French western film directed by Pierre Couderc and starring Gaston Glass and Jeanne Helbling. It is the French-language version of Fox's The Big Trail (1930) starring John Wayne and directed by Raoul Walsh. In the early years of sound it was common to make multiple-language versions of films, until the practice of dubbing became more widespread.

Cast
 Gaston Glass as Pierre Calmine 
 Jeanne Helbling as Denise Vernon 
 Margot Rousseroy as Yvette 
 Raoul Paoli as Flack 
 Louis Mercier as Lopez 
 Jacques Vanaire as Mayer 
 Jacques Jou-Jerville as Wellmore 
 Frank O'Neill as Lucien 
 Émile Chautard as Padre 
 André Ferrier as Blancart 
 George Davis as Pepin

References

Bibliography
 Solomon, Aubrey. The Fox Film Corporation, 1915-1935. A History and Filmography. McFarland & Co, 2011.

External links

1931 films
1931 Western (genre) films
1930s French-language films
French Western (genre) films
Films directed by Pierre Couderc
Fox Film films
French multilingual films
French black-and-white films
1931 multilingual films
1930s American films
1930s French films